is a Japanese model and actress based in Taiwan.

Early life
Okubo was born in Nagasaki Prefecture, Japan, on September 7, 1984.

Career
Okubo debuted as a gravure idol in 2003. She later started a career in acting, moving to Taiwan in 2011.

In 2013, she won the Golden Bell Awards for Best Supporting Actress in Taiwan.

Filmography

Film
SS (2008)
La Lingerie (2015)
The Bold, the Corrupt, and the Beautiful (2017)

Television
Toritsu Mizusho! (2006, NTV), Naomi
Juken Sentai Gekiranger (2007, TV Asahi)
GodHand Teru (2009, TBS), Kaori Hasegawa
Orthros no Inu (2009, TBS)
Substitute for Love (2012, PTS)
Shia Wa Se (2015, TTV)

References

External links

1984 births
Actors from Nagasaki Prefecture
Japanese actresses
Japanese expatriates in Taiwan
Japanese gravure idols
Japanese television personalities
Living people
Models from Nagasaki Prefecture